Theodore Otto Kleinhans (born Traugott Otto Kleinhans, April 8, 1899 – July 24, 1985) was a Major League Baseball pitcher. He was born in Deer Park, Wisconsin. Kleinhans played 4 seasons in Major League Baseball, with the Philadelphia Phillies and Cincinnati Reds in 1934, the New York Yankees in 1936, and the Reds again in 1937 and 1938. He had a career record of 4–9 in 56 games. He was the third oldest player in Major League Baseball in 1938.

Prior to playing professional baseball, Kleinhans enlisted in the Ohio National Guard. During World War I, the unit was mobilized and sent to France where he was wounded in the Meuse–Argonne offensive. He left the Guard in 1919 as a sergeant. During World War II, he again served his country, this time as a captain with a US Army medical unit stationed in Scotland and England.

From 1947 to 1966 Kleinhans was head coach for the Syracuse Orangemen baseball team, compiling a 156–146 (.516) record.  He died in Redington Beach, Florida, where he lived.

References

External links

 

1899 births
1985 deaths
Cincinnati Reds players
Major League Baseball pitchers
New York Yankees players
Philadelphia Phillies players
Syracuse Orangemen baseball coaches
Syracuse University alumni
Syracuse Chiefs players
People from Pinellas County, Florida
People from St. Croix County, Wisconsin
Baseball players from Wisconsin
United States Army personnel of World War I
United States Army personnel of World War II
United States Army officers
Ohio National Guard personnel
Military personnel from Wisconsin